Mexico is the ninth studio album by the Icelandic electronic musicians GusGus, released on Kompakt label, following successful album Arabian Horse. It contains nine tracks, one of which is instrumental. After several line-up changes, Mexico was produced by Stephan Stephensen (aka President Bongo) and Birgir Þórarinsson (aka Biggi Veira). Högni Egilsson of Hjaltalín, Daníel Ágúst Haraldsson and Urður Hákonardóttir made appearance as vocalists for this LP.

The album title Mexico is a metaphor of "going west", as humans always tend to go in a westerly direction. Daníel, who came up with this idea as a name for an album, felt very strongly it. Högni lately explained that "sometimes the things that stand out lay behind meaning and intellectuality" and that "It’s not necessarily something that we can describe in any way."

Track listing
All songs written by GusGus.

Chart positions

References

2014 albums
GusGus albums
Kompakt albums